Henry Darlington Jr. (October 12, 1932 – December 15, 2016) was an American football coach. He served as the head football coach at Morehouse College in Atlanta, Georgia from 1967 to 1971, compiling a record of 17–23–2.

References

1932 births
2016 deaths
Morehouse Maroon Tigers football coaches
Sportspeople from Augusta, Georgia